The Horton River is a river in Inuvik and Sahtu Regions, Northwest Territories and Kitikmeot Region, Nunavut, Canada. It is a tributary of the Beaufort Sea and hence part of the Arctic Ocean drainage basin. Only the first few kilometres from its source are within Nunavut.

Course

The mouth had been  further north at Harrowby Bay on the west side of Cape Bathurst until about 1800 when a meander eroded through.

There is an airstrip just north of the mouth.

DEW Line/NWS
Originally opened as a Distant Early Warning Line site it closed in 1963. The site was reopened in 1991 as a North Warning System short range radar.

See also
List of longest rivers of Canada
List of rivers of the Northwest Territories

References

External links
Inuvialuit Television's documentary on the Horton River DEW Line site cleanup

Rivers of the Northwest Territories
Inuvik Region
Sahtu Region
Rivers of Kitikmeot Region
Geography of the Inuvialuit Settlement Region